Darius Gray is an African-American Latter-day Saint speaker and writer.

Gray was born in Colorado Springs, Colorado. He joined the Church of Jesus Christ of Latter-day Saints (LDS Church) in 1964. He attended Brigham Young University for one year and then transferred to the University of Utah. Gray worked for a time as a journalist.

LDS Church service
Gray was a counselor in the presidency of the LDS Church's Genesis Group when it was formed in 1971.  He was president of the group from 1997 to 2003.  Gray was also the co-director (with Marie Taylor) of the Freedmens Bank Records project for the church's Family History Department.  He is a speaker on African-American genealogy, blacks in the Bible and blacks in the LDS Church. He had also written a trilogy of historical novels ("Standing on the Promises") with Margaret Blair Young, and co-produced/directed a documentary with Young as well: "Nobody Knows: The Untold Story of Black Mormons." Utah's NAACP honored him with its Martin Luther King Jr. award in 2008, and the Iota Iota chapter of Omega Psi Phi fraternity honored him as "Citizen of the Year" in 2011.

Gray has traveled throughout the United States to make presentations. In 2007, he appeared in the PBS documentary The Mormons. In February 2008, he made an invitation-only presentation at the Charles H. Wright Museum of African American History in Detroit that was partly sponsored by New Detroit. He is also featured in the BYU Television series Questions and Ancestors. Gray has also served as a developer of the website blacklds.org and on the advisory board of Reach the Children, a humanitarian organization designed to help people in Africa.

Gray was among those involved in Developing the "Race and the Priesthood" essay published on the website of The Church of Jesus Christ of Latter-day Saints in December 2013. In 2014 Gray was given a special citation by the Mormon History Association for contributions to Mormon history.

See also

References

External links
 
Darius Gray at FairMormon.org

21st-century African-American writers
21st-century American historians
American male non-fiction writers
Academics from Colorado
African-American Latter Day Saints
African-American historians
African-American religious leaders
American Latter Day Saint writers
American leaders of the Church of Jesus Christ of Latter-day Saints
Brigham Young University alumni
Converts to Mormonism
Genealogy and the Church of Jesus Christ of Latter-day Saints
Historians of Utah
Historians of the Latter Day Saint movement
Latter Day Saints from Colorado
Latter Day Saints from Utah
Living people
Mormon studies scholars
Mormonism and race
University of Utah alumni
Year of birth missing (living people)
21st-century American male writers